Patrick Gideon Wolff (born February 15, 1968) is an American chess Grandmaster. He is the son of philosopher Robert Paul Wolff and brother of law professor Tobias Barrington Wolff. Wolff won the United States Chess Championship in 1992 and 1995.

Chess career

In addition to his two United States championships (1992 and 1995), Wolff also had a distinguished scholastic chess career, winning the 1983 National High School Championship and the 1987 U.S. Junior Championship.

In 1988, in a game played in New York City, Wolff defeated the world champion Garry Kasparov during a simultaneous exhibition in just 25 moves with the black pieces:1.c4 e5 2.g3 Nf6 3.Bg2 c6 4.d4 exd4 5.Qxd4 d5 6.cxd5 cxd5 7.Nf3 Nc6 8.Qa4 Be7 9.0-0 0-0 10.Be3 Ng4 11.Bd4 Nxd4 12.Nxd4 Qb6 13.Nc3 Qh6 14.h4 g5 15.Nxd5 Bd8 16.Rac1 gxh4 17.Rxc8 hxg3 18.Nf3 Nh2 19.Rfc1 Rxc8 20.Rxc8 Nxf3+ 21.exf3 gxf2+ 22.Kf1 Qd2 23.Nf6+ Kg7 24.Ne8+ Kh8 25.Qe4 Bh4 0–1

This game, although played as part of a simultaneous exhibition against five other masters, was one of Kasparov's shortest losses in his career.

In 1995, the same year he won his second United States championship, Wolff served as a second to challenger Viswanathan Anand in preparation for the Classical World Chess Championship 1995 match against champion Kasparov. Although Anand led the match after nine games, Kasparov eventually prevailed 10.5 to 7.5.

Wolff is also the author of the Complete Idiot's Guide to Chess. He graduated from Harvard College in 1996, and the trophy of the annual Harvard-Yale intercollegiate chess match is named the Wolff Cup in his honor, as he remains the only grandmaster to participate in the match as a member of both colleges (beginning at Yale University and graduating from Harvard).

Wolff's game against Vassily Ivanchuk from the Biel Invitational in 1993 was featured in the 2020 Netflix limited series, The Queen's Gambit (miniseries). Kasparov, who acted as a chess consultant for the series, selected and modified the 1993 game to serve as the game played during the series' climax.

Investing career
Wolff was previously a managing director at San Francisco hedge fund Clarium, a $3B global macro hedge fund. He left Clarium to launch Grandmaster Capital Management, a hedge fund that received seed capital from Peter Thiel, the founder of Clarium and a strong chess player himself.

Hedge Fund Alert reported that Wolff started the wind-down process of Grandmaster Capital in June 2015.

Over the past several years, Wolff has given a blindfolded simultaneous exhibition for all comers at the annual Berkshire Hathaway shareholder meeting in Omaha, Nebraska headed by CEO Warren Buffett and Vice-Chairman Charlie Munger.

Personal life
While originally from the Boston area, Wolff currently resides in San Francisco.

References

External links
 
 
 Kasparov vs Wolff, 0-1 (requires Java plugin)
 "American Gambit: Kasparov vs US Juniors", Chessbase News, 13 April 2010

1968 births
20th-century American Jews
21st-century American Jews
American chess players
Chess grandmasters
Harvard College alumni
Jewish chess players
Living people